There have been several Street Fighter anime adaptions, including:

Street Fighter II: The Animated Movie, a 1994 theatrical film
Street Fighter II: Return to Fujiwara, a 1995 Short film
Street Fighter II V, a 1995 television series
Street Fighter Alpha: The Animation, a 1999 OVA film
Street Fighter Alpha: Generations, a 2005 OVA film
Street Fighter: Round One - Fight, a 2009 OVA Film
Street Fighter IV: The Ties That Bind, a 2009 OVA film
Street Fighter: The New Challengers, 2011 OVA Film
Street Fighter IV: Juri, a 2012 Short Film